Consider may refer to:
 Consider (MUD), a capability in some MUDs
 Consider (album), an EP by Boysetsfire
 Consideration, a legal concept
 The act of consideration as in Perspective (cognitive)